Clay is a 1965 Australian drama film directed by Giorgio Mangiamele. The film was nominated for the Golden Palm award at the 1965 Cannes Film Festival, but it lost to The Knack ...and How to Get It.

Plot
Nick is a murderer on the run from the police. He finds a remote artists' colony and takes shelter there. Whilst there, he falls in love with a sculptor named Margot. When Nick is betrayed to the police by a jealous rival, Chris, Margot kills herself.

Cast
 Janina Lebedew as Margot
 George Dixon as Nick
 Chris Tsalikis as Chris
 Claude Thomas as Father
 Bobby Clark as Charles
 Sheila Florance as Deaf-mute
 Lola Russell as Mary
 Cole Turnley as Businessman

Production
The film was shot in 1964, with the crew consisting of Mangiamele, a camera assistant and a sound technician. The budget was raised by Mangiamele mortgaging his house and the cast contributing £200 each. Filming started in May and took six weeks, mostly at an artist's colony in Montsalvat. Lead actor Janina Lebedew had her voice dubbed by Sheila Florence.

Release
Clay  was the first Australian film selected for competition at the Cannes Film Festival.

In March 1965, ABC bought the TV rights for £2,600 and the film won to awards for photography at the 1965 AFIs. However it was poorly received at the Sydney Film Festival and Melbourne Film Festival and struggled to get commercial release.

References

External links

Clay at Australian Screen Online
Clay at Oz Movies

1965 films
1965 drama films
Australian drama films
Australian black-and-white films
Films about sculptors
1960s English-language films